Native peach may refer to flowering plants not in the rose family (Rosaceae), which includes actual peaches:

Santalum acuminatum, also known as desert quandong
Trema tomentosa var. viridus, also known as peach-leaved poison bush